Simone (stylized as S1M0̸NE) is a 2002 American satirical science fiction film written, produced, and directed by Andrew Niccol. It stars Al Pacino, Catherine Keener, Evan Rachel Wood, Rachel Roberts, Jay Mohr, and Winona Ryder. The story follows a fading director creating a virtual actress to star in his films and the attempts he makes to keep her non-presence a secret as she becomes more famous. Simone garnered mixed reviews from critics but was a minor box-office hit, grossing $19.6 million worldwide against its $10 million budget.

Plot
When Nicola Anders (Winona Ryder), the star of the new film by out-of-favor director Viktor Taransky (Al Pacino), refuses to finish it, Taransky is forced to find a replacement. Contractual requirements totally prevent using her image in the film, so he must re-shoot. Instead, Taransky experiments with a new computer program he inherits from late acquaintance Hank Aleno (Elias Koteas) which allows the creation of a computer-generated woman which he can easily animate to play the film's central character. Taransky names his virtual actor "Simone," a name derived from the computer program's title, Simulation One. Seamlessly incorporated into the film, Simone (Rachel Roberts) gives a fantastic performance, exactly controlled by Taransky. The film is immediately a huge success. The studio, and soon the world, ask "who is Simone?"

Taransky initially claims that Simone is a recluse and requests her privacy be respected, but that only intensifies media demands for her to appear. Taransky intends to reveal the secret of her non-existence after the second picture. To satisfy demand, he executes a number of progressively ambitious stunts relying on misdirection and cinematic special effects technology. Eventually, it escalates to simulated remote location video live interviews.

In one instance, two determined tabloid reporters discover Taransky used out-of-date stock photography as a background during an interview instead of being on that site as claimed, and they blackmail him into getting Simone to make a live appearance. He arranges her to perform a song at a stadium event appearing in a cloud of smoke and then using flawless holographic technology. The perception of being in person is reinforced with real-time visualization on the stadium's monitors. Simone becomes even more famous, simultaneously becoming a double winner for the Academy Award for Best Actress, tying with herself in the process.

Once Taransky grows tired of Simone constantly overshadowing him in the press, he decides to ruin her career. Simone's next film, I Am Pig, is her "directorial debut" and a tasteless treatment about zoophilia intended to disgust audiences. Not only does it fail to achieve the desired effect of audience alienation, but it also serves to foster her credibility as a risk-taking, fearless and avant-garde artist. Taransky's subsequent attempts to discredit Simone—by having her drink, smoke, and curse at public appearances and use politically incorrect statements—similarly backfire when the press instead begins to see her as refreshingly honest. As a last resort, Taransky decides to dispose of Simone completely by using a computer virus to erase her, dumping the hard drive and floppy disks into a steamer trunk, burying the trunk at sea, and then announcing to the press that she has died of a rare virus contracted on her Goodwill Tour of the Third World. During the funeral, the police interrupt, open the coffin and find only a cardboard cutout of Simone. He is arrested and shown a security camera video where he loads a large trunk onto his yacht.

After being charged with her murder, he admits that Simone is not a person, but a computer program. The chest containing the computer data is brought up empty. Taransky's daughter Lainey and ex-wife Elaine enter his studio to try to help. They find Taransky's forgotten virus source disk (Plague) and apply an anti-virus program to eradicate the computer virus. They restore Simone and have her appear on national television laughing while holding up a newspaper headline with her obituary. They pick up a confused Taransky, with whom Elaine asks to get back together. In the end, Simone and Taransky are remotely interviewed at home about their new (virtual) baby, used as a cover story for her absence. Simone is concerned about her child's future and decides to enter politics.

A post-credits scene reveals Viktor creating footage of Simone buying a calorie-laden meat pie TV dinner at a supermarket, while tabloid investigator character Max Sayer, who has an obsessive crush on Simone throughout the film, is thrilled to discover that she appears to love meat pies as much as he does.

Production
Like Andrew Niccol's predecessor Gattaca, Simone deals with themes of the problematic aspects of technological advances being used to attempt to attain perfection. Unlike the former, however, Simone was Niccol's first attempt at a comedic satire with lighter moments and over-the-top drama. Niccol's first attempt at non-satire had been the earlier and more successful The Truman Show. Pruitt Taylor Vince and Jason Schwartzman were cast as obese tabloid investigator Max Sayer and his shady-looking but peculiarly childlike assistant, Milton, respectively. Rebecca Romijn was cast later in the role of Faith, Viktor's secretary who is so obsessed with Simone that she begins dressing like Simone, dying her hair like Simone and even trying to have sex with Viktor just so that she can hear him call her "Simone". These side-actors built up much of the side comedy surrounding the bizarre cultural phenomenon surrounding Simone. Footage of character Holly Golightly from Breakfast At Tiffany's was obtained from Paramount Studios to be used in the film for part of the basis of the Simone character, while scenic footage used for Simone's "remote interview" backgrounds was obtained from Getty Images. Stylized elements present throughout the film and its post-credits included the use of #1 in place of any letter 'I', and a #0 in place of any letter 'O', which occurs for the entire duration of the credits, including for all cast and crew names featured. Principal photography was done by Edward Lachman, while the entirety of the production was made in California, using the Getty stock footage to fill in for locations such as Egypt's Great Pyramids.

Simone featured a cover of (You Make Me Feel Like) A Natural Woman, which Simone sings during a concert scene via hologram, and which later plays over the end credits. Additional music was created by Carter Burwell, and was released on CD alongside the film's 2002 release.

Special effects
The film shows how the fake is produced using the chroma key technique. A post-credits sequence shows Viktor creating fake footage of Simone in a supermarket, which one of her pursuers sees, believing it real.

Cast

 Al Pacino as Viktor Taransky
 Catherine Keener as Elaine Christian
 Evan Rachel Wood as Lainey Christian
 Rachel Roberts as Simone
 Winona Ryder as Nicola Anders
 Jay Mohr as Hal Sinclair
 Pruitt Taylor Vince as Max Sayer
 Jason Schwartzman as Milton
 Elias Koteas as Hank Aleno (uncredited)
 Rebecca Romijn as Faith (uncredited)
 Joel Heyman as Male
 Kelly Anna Cox as Young Simone

Reception

Box office
The film opened at #9 on the North American box office chart, grossing US$3,813,463 in its opening weekend. The film grossed $19,576,023 worldwide.

Critical response
Simone received mixed reviews from critics. The site's consensus reads: "The satire in S1m0ne lacks bite, and the plot isn't believable enough to feel relevant." Metacritic, which assigns a weighted average out of 100 top reviews from mainstream critics, calculated an average score of 49, based on 38 reviews, indicating "mixed or average reviews".

Roger Ebert was critical of Niccol wasting his premise by giving it a broad appeal with "sitcom simplicity" and his cast a narrow direction for their characters, saying: "He wants to edge it in the direction of a Hollywood comedy, but the satire is not sharp enough and the characters, including the ex-wife, are too routine." The Guardians Peter Bradshaw wrote that "It's reasonable material, but there are no real plot twists or unexpected implications; it all just rolls out easily in a Hollywood that director Niccol makes appear so unreal as to be an easy target". Marc Savlov of The Austin Chronicle said, "What really irked me about Simone was that it stank of the very thing it appeared to be mocking: it's a big-budget, commercial film taking potshots at big-budget, commercial filmmaking (as well as overripe, over-earnest indies), and although it strives constantly for a sense of knowing, winking irony, the only thing ironic about it is how much it resembles its supposed target." Elvis Mitchell of The New York Times said, "The writer-director Mr. Niccol is satirizing the kinds of dazzling empties he himself has made. [Mr. Niccol is] fascinated with surfaces—the films he's been involved with (he wrote The Truman Show and wrote and directed Gattaca) are a mix of populism and deconstruction. His newest effort, Simone, goes beyond postmodern to post-entertainment—it's tepid and vapid."

See also
M3GAN (2022 film featuring an artificial intelligence smart toy designed to look like a little girl, becoming the "friend" of its child companion)
Black Mirror (television series featuring celebrities made from simulated digital bodies, worlds and lifestyles similar to "Simone")
Small Wonder (comedy sitcom where an ordinary family pretends that an invented robot made to mimic a little girl is their real child)
Gattaca
The Truman Show
VTuber (media phenomenon centering on virtual avatar entertainment)
Shudu Gram, a computer generated social media personality and model, considered the world's first digital supermodel.

References

External links
 
 
 
 

2002 films
2000s American films
2000s English-language films
2000s satirical films
2000s science fiction comedy-drama films
American satirical films
American science fiction comedy-drama films
Films about computing
Films about telepresence
Films directed by Andrew Niccol
Films scored by Carter Burwell
Films set in a movie theatre
New Line Cinema films
Films with screenplays by Andrew Niccol